Pultenaea rodwayi is a species of flowering plant in the family Fabaceae and is endemic to south-eastern New South Wales. It is an erect shrub with hairy branchlets, linear leaves, and yellow to orange and red, pea-like flowers.

Description

Taxonomy and naming
Pultenaea rodwayi was first formally described in 2003 by Rogier Petrus Johannes de Kok in Australian Systematic Botany from an unpublished description by Mary Tindale.

Distribution and habitat

References

rodwayi
Flora of New South Wales
Plants described in 2003